Nina Urqu (Quechua nina fire, urqu mountain, "fire mountain", also spelled Nina Orkho) is a  mountain in the Andes of Bolivia. It is situated in the Potosí Department, Sud Lípez Province, in the north of the Esmoruco Municipality, south-west of Guadalupe. Nina Urqu lies south-east of the mountains P'aqu Urqu, Waqrayuq and Muruq'u.

References 

Mountains of Potosí Department